Trin-i-tee 5:7 is an American girl group formed in 1997. The original lineup composed of Chanelle Haynes, Angel Taylor, and Terri Brown-Britton. The group was launched into mainstream recognition following the release of their best-selling debut album, Trin-i-tee 5:7 (1998), which contained the top-charting gospel single "God's Grace". The album became certified gold. Despite critical and commercial success, the group experienced a lineup change when as Terri Brown left the group in 1999.

In mid-1999, Adrian Anderson was added to the group and they released their second album, Spiritual Love. In 2002, they followed up with the release of The Kiss. Their fourth album T57 (2007) earned a Grammy nomination for Best Contemporary R&B Gospel Album. The album spawned the top-charting singles: "Listen" and "Get Away". Following the departure of Anderson in 2011, Trin-i-tee 5:7 moved forward as duo and released their sixth album Angel & Chanelle.

Trin-i-tee 5:7 has sold more than two million records worldwide to date, and is recognized as one of the most successful contemporary gospel acts of their era. They were also ranked as the tenth Top Gospel Artist of the Year by Billboard, in 2002. Their work has earned them several awards and nominations, including two Dove Music Awards, one Stellar Award, two Grammy nominations, and two BET Award nominations.

BET Awards
The BET Awards were established in 2001 by the Black Entertainment Television network to celebrate African Americans and other minorities in music, acting, sports, and other fields of entertainment. Trin-i-tee 5:7 has received 2 nominations.

Dove Awards
The Dove Awards are an accolade by the Gospel Music Association (GMA) of the United States to recognize outstanding achievement in the Christian music industry. The awards are presented annually.

GMWA Awards
The GMWA Award of Excellence are an accolade by the Gospel Music Workshop Of America (GMWA) of the United States to recognize outstanding achievement in the Gospel music industry.

Grammy Awards

MOBO Awards

The MOBO Awards (an acronym for Music of Black Origin) are held annually in the United Kingdom to recognize artists of any race or nationality performing music of black origin. Trin-i-tee 5:7 has received one nominations.

Soul Train Music Awards
The Soul Train Music Awards is an annual awards show that honors the best in African American music and entertainment. Trin-i-tee 5:7 has received 1 nomination.

Stellar Awards
The Stellar Awards is an annual awards show in the US, honoring Gospel Music Artists, writers, and industry professionals for their contributions to the gospel music industry. Trin-i-tee 5:7 has been nominated fourteen times and won one award.

References

Trin-i-tee 5:7